The Cuba national football team represents Cuba in men's international football and it is controlled by the Football Association of Cuba. Nicknamed Leones del Caribe (Lions of Caribbean), the team represents all three FIFA, Caribbean Football Union and Confederation of North, Central American and Caribbean Association  Football (CONCACAF).

They were the first Caribbean team to get to the World Cup Quarter finals – they did so in 1938. There, in the round of 16, they defeated Romania in a replay, 2–1, after drawing against them 3–3. They were then eliminated in the quarter-finals by Sweden, 8–0. Cuba has not returned to the World Cup since.

Cuba finished second in the North American Nations Cup in 1947, which they hosted the tournament, second also in Caribbean Cup in 1996, 1999, and 2005, but won in 2012.

History

Early history
Cuba played its first international football match on 16 March 1930 at that year's Central American and Caribbean Games. They beat Jamaica (then a British colony) 3–1 in Havana. Four days later, they beat Honduras 7–0. Cuba were managed by José Tapia, who remained in charge until after Cuba's 1938 World Cup campaign.

Cuba's first World Cup qualification campaign was for the 1934 World Cup in Italy. All of the CONCACAF entrants were placed in Group 11. The winner of a best-of-three tournament between the two weakest nations, Cuba and Haiti would produce a winner to play 1930 qualifiers Mexico in another round of best-of-three. The winner of that would play 1930 semi-finalists the United States of America for a place in the finals. All of the matches between Cuba and Haiti in the first round were staged at Parc Leconte in Port-au-Prince, Haiti, on  28, 1 and 4 January–February 1934. Cuba won the first match 3–1 with Mario Lopez opening from a penalty and Hector Socorro scoring the second. The second match was a 1–1 draw with Lopez equalising in the 85th minute. In the final match, Cuba won 6–0 with two Lopez goals, one from Hector Socorro and one from his brother Francisco.

The second round against Mexico consisted of three matches at Parque Necaxa in Mexico City. Its first match, on 4 March 1934, saw Mexico go 3–0 up with a hat-trick by Dionisio Mejia, his goals scored in the 12th, 14th and 16th minutes. Mario Lopez scored twice for Cuba with one in each half, but Mexico won 3–2. A week later, Mejia scored another hat-trick as Mexico won 5–0, and seven days later, Mexico won 4–1 after Lopez opened the scoring in the 15th minute. Mexico did not qualify, their 4–2 play-off defeat to the United States was held in Rome during the finals, as the two teams had forgotten to stage it earlier.

1938–2000
The decision to stage the 1938 World Cup in France was poorly received in the Americas, who had hoped for it to return to South America after the 1934 World Cup in Italy. All nations in South America except Brazil withdrew, and all CONCACAF nations except Cuba, thus the two qualified by default.

The tournament was held as a straight knock-out tournament of 16 nations. Cuba were drawn to play their first-ever World Cup finals match against Romania (who were making their third finals appearance) at Stade du T.O.E.C. in Toulouse, on 5 June 1938. Silviu Bindea put Romania ahead after 35 minutes and Hector Socorro equalised nine minutes later. With three minutes remaining, Tomás Fernández gave Cuba the lead, but within a minute Iuliu Baratky forced extra time with a Romanian equaliser. Romania went 3–2 up in extra-time by Ștefan Dobay's goal on 105 minutes, but Juan Tuñas equalised for Cuba with three minutes of extra-time remaining.

The replay was held at the same stadium, on 9 June. This was at the same time as Switzerland's 4–2 replay win over Germany. Dobay put Romania 1–0 up at half-time with a 35th-minute goal, but in the second half Cuba equalised through Socorro in the 51st minute. Six minutes later, Carlos Oliviera scored the winning goal and it ended 2–1.
In the quarter-final, Cuba lost 8–0 to Sweden at Stade du Fort Carre in Antibes, on 12 June. Sweden's Tore Keller and Gustav Wetterström each scored hat-tricks.

The NAFC Championship 1949 served as CONCACAF's qualification group for the 1950 World Cup in Brazil. Cuba, the United States of America and Mexico played each other twice in a tournament held in Mexico City in September 1949. The top two would qualify. Cuba came third and did not qualify, their only point was gained from their second match, a 1–1 draw against the United States on 14 September. Cuba did not compete in World Cup qualification again until 1966, already under Castro's regime. They returned to participation in qualification for 1978, but the 1982 qualifiers represented a significant breakthrough- Cuba reached the final round of qualifying, and were only two points short of reaching the 1982 World Cup. In recent years, Cuban football has seen an improvement in results.

2000–present
They reached the quarter-finals of the 2003 Gold Cup (where they were beaten by the United States) by defeating Canada 2–0 in the Group stage. During the 2006 World Cup qualifiers, Cuba faced Costa Rica and were only eliminated on away goals. They held Costa Rica to a draw in Havana 2–2 and later battled it out for a 1–1 draw in Costa Rica.

During the 2010 World Cup qualifiers, Cuba faced Antigua and Barbuda and the match ended in a 3–3 draw. Later in Pedro Marreo, Cuba won 4–1 to advance to the semi-final round of the CONCACAF World Cup qualifiers. Cuba was with the United States, Trinidad and Tobago and Guatemala. Cuba finished in the fourth place with only one victory against Guatemala 2–1 with a goal scored by Aliannis Urgellés.
They finished in third place in the 2010 Caribbean Cup to take a place in the 2011 Gold Cup. In 2012, Cuba won the Caribbean Cup for the first time.

For the 2014 World Cup, the Cuban team qualified directly to the Third round as one of the six highest ranked teams and were placed in Group C with Honduras, Panama, and Canada. Although the Cuban team had several close games, they ended their qualification process with one draw and five defeats (losing home and away to Canada and Honduras and drawing to Panama in Havana in their final game after losing in Panama City). Their only goal of the qualifying campaign came from Alberto Gomes against Panama in the final game of the group stage.

Defection and economic migration by Cuban athletes

As well as Cuban athletes in other sports, a number of football players have made the move to the United States in recent years. During the 2002 Gold Cup in Los Angeles, two Cuban players Rey Ángel Martínez and Alberto Delgado chose to remain in the United States. Striker Maykel Galindo did so during the 2005 Gold Cup. Two more, Osvaldo Alonso and Lester More did so during the 2007 Gold Cup.

In 2008, defections occurred during two separate tournaments held in the United States. In March, seven players from the U-23 national football, including Yeniel Bermúdez, Yordany Álvarez and Yendry Díaz defected during the 2008 CONCACAF Olympic Qualifying tournament while the team was based in Tampa, FL. In October, two days before the country's World Cup Qualifier versus the US, Reynier Alcántara and Pedro Faife walked away from the team's hotel near Washington, D.C.. During the 2011 CONCACAF Gold Cup, Yosniel Mesa defected while the team was in Charlotte, North Carolina.  During the 2015 Gold Cup, forward Keiler García defected to the United States before the team's first match against Mexico in Chicago. In September 2019, five players (Yordan Santa Cruz, Andy Baquero, David Urgelles, Orlendis Benítez and Alejandro Portal) defected to Canada during the 2019–20 CONCACAF Nations League before and after a match against Canada.

Recent results and forthcoming fixtures
The following is a list of match results in the last 12 months, as well as any future matches that have been scheduled.

2022

2023

Coaching history

 José Tapia (1930–1934) 
 Gavin Newton (1934–1935)
 José Tapia (1935–1938)
 Marcelino Minsal (1947–1949)
 František Churda (1963–1964) 
 Karoly Kósa (1966) 
 László Mohácsi (1967)
 Kim Yong-ha (1970–1971)
 Sergio Padrón (1976)
 Tibor Ivanics (1980–1981) 
 Roberto Hernández (1985–1988) 
 Giovanni Campari (1990–1996)
 William Bennett (1996–2000)
 Miguel Company (2000–2004)
 Luis Armelio Garcia (2004–2005)
 Raúl González (2006–2007)
 Reinhold Fanz (2008)
 Raúl González (2008–2012)
 Chandler González (2012)
 Walter Benítez (2012–2015)
 Raúl González (2015–2016)
 Julio Valero (2016)
 Raúl Mederos (2016–2019)
 Pablo Elier Sánchez (2019–present)

Players

Current squad
The following players were called up for the friendly matches against Dominican Republic on 15 and 18 November 2022.

Caps and goals correct as of 12 June 2022, after the match against Antigua and Barbuda

Recent call-ups
The following players have also been called up to the Cuba squad within the last twelve months.

INJ Player withdrew from the squad due to an injury.
PRE Preliminary squad.
RET Player retired from the national team.
SUS Player is serving suspension.
WD Player withdrew from the squad due to non-injury issue.

Previous squads

FIFA World Cup
1938 FIFA World Cup squad

CONCACAF Gold Cup
1998 CONCACAF Gold Cup squad
2002 CONCACAF Gold Cup squad
2003 CONCACAF Gold Cup squad
2005 CONCACAF Gold Cup squad
2007 CONCACAF Gold Cup squad
2011 CONCACAF Gold Cup squad
2013 CONCACAF Gold Cup squad
2015 CONCACAF Gold Cup squad
2019 CONCACAF Gold Cup squad

Olympic football tournament
1976 Summer Olympics squad
1980 Summer Olympics squad

Player records

Players in bold are still active with Cuba

Most appearances

Top goalscorers

Competitive record

FIFA World Cup

CONCACAF Gold Cup

CONCACAF Nations League

CFU Caribbean Cup

NAFC Championship record

CCCF Championship

Honours
Major competitions

FIFA World Cup
 Quarter-finals (1): 1938

Minor competitions

Pan American Games
 Runners-up (1): 1979 San Juan
 Third place (2): 1971 Cali, 1991 Havana
 Central American and Caribbean Games
 Winners (1): 1930 Havana
 North American Nations Cup
 Runners-up (1): 1947
CFU Championship / Caribbean Cup
 Winners (1): 2012
 Runners-up (3): 1996, 1999, 2005
 Third place (3): 1995, 2007, 2010

See also

Cuba national under-20 football team
Cuba national under-17 football team

References

External links

Cuba at FIFA.com

 
Caribbean national association football teams